Milano-Mantova was an Italian men's cycling race organized for the last time in 1962. The course, variating from 144 to 274 km, was situated in Lombardy.

Organised by La Gazzetta dello Sport, it was held for the first time on 20 May 1906. After the first three experimental editions from 1906 to 1908, the race returned to the calendar in 1932. From 1936 until the 1943 edition, the name became Trofeo Moschini. After World War II, from 1946, it was organized again under the name Milano-Mantova, until the last edition in 1962.

Winners

References 

Cycle races in Italy
1906 establishments in Italy
Defunct cycling races in Italy
Recurring sporting events established in 1906
Recurring sporting events disestablished in 1962
1962 disestablishments in Italy